Martin John Bullock (born 5 March 1975) is an English former professional footballer who played as a midfielder. He is a Football Development Officer at Northern Football Federation. He previously played for five league teams over fifteen years, making 452 league appearances. He also won a cap for the England under-21 side in 1996.

He began his career at non-league Eastwood Town, before earning a move to Barnsley in 1993. In an eight-year association with the club he played almost 200 league games for the club, helping them to the Premier League at the end of the 1996–97 season. Loaned out to Port Vale in 2000, the following year he transferred to Blackpool. He enjoyed a highly successful four years with the club, lifting the Football League Trophy in 2002 and 2004. He then played for Macclesfield Town between 2005 and 2007, before ending his professional career with Wycombe Wanderers in 2008. He later turned out for leading New Zealand side Waitakere United, helping them to three Premiership titles, before his retirement in June 2012.

Club career
Bullock began his career with Northern Premier League First Division side Eastwood Town. He turned professional after a £15,000 move to Barnsley in 1993. He remained at Oakwell for eight years, making 218 appearances in all competitions for the "Tykes". He played 28 league games, mostly as a substitute, in the club's historic 1996–97 campaign, which saw them finish second in the First Division. In the subsequent 1997–98 Premier League season he played 33 top-flight games. Barnsley were relegated, though Bullock remained a key part of their 1998–99 campaign. He found himself out of favour in 1999–2000 however, making just six starts, five of which were in the League Cup. He was utilised more frequently in 2000–01, after spending February 2000 on loan at Second Division Port Vale, for whom he scored once against Queens Park Rangers.

In September 2001 he joined Steve McMahon's Second Division newcomers Blackpool on a free transfer. He became a key player for the club, making 43 league appearances in his maiden season there. His contribution was particularly telling in the semi-final of the Football League Trophy, as he scored the golden goal winner against Huddersfield Town that ensured the club a date at the Millennium Stadium. He went on to play the full ninety minutes of the club's triumph over Cambridge United in the final.

He enjoyed a similarly successful campaign in 2002–03, and was offered a two-year contract extension in March 2003. He was later named in the PFA Second Division Team of the Year for his performances throughout the season. The 2003–04 campaign was also memorable for Bullock, as he helped Blackpool to lift the League Trophy for the second time in three seasons, following victory over Southend United. He made a further 28 league appearances for the club in 2004–05, but was told by new boss Colin Hendry he would not be offered a new contract. He signed for Brian Horton's Macclesfield Town in June 2005. In his first season with the club he made 40 appearances in League Two. He made a further 43 appearances in his second season at Moss Rose. In May 2007 he switched clubs to Wycombe Wanderers, penning a two-year deal. He made 27 appearances in all competitions for the club in 2007–08, before he announced his retirement from the professional game in May 2008.

In 2009, he made a late move to New Zealand to play for Waitakere United. Following a second-place finish in 2009–10, Waitakere went on to reach the final of the OFC Champions League, and Bullock played both games of the 4–2 aggregate defeat to Papua New Guinea side Hekari United. Waitakere went on to win the championship in 2010–11 after defeating rivals Auckland City. They retained their title in 2011–12 with a 4–1 win over Team Wellington. He retired at the age of 37 in June 2012.

International career
Whilst with Barnsley, Bullock won a cap for the England under-21 side in 1996.

Personal life
Bullock is married to Michelle Bullock with two children Lillie and Maggie and is focusing on earning his coaching badges to coach professionally.

Career statistics

Honours
Individual
Football League Second Division Team of the Year: 2002–03

Barnsley
Football League First Division second-place promotion: 1996–97

Blackpool
Football League Trophy: 2002, 2004

Waitakere United
New Zealand Football Championship: 2010–11 & 2011–12
OFC Champions League runner-up: 2010

References

1975 births
Living people
Footballers from Derby
English footballers
England under-21 international footballers
Association football midfielders
Eastwood Town F.C. players
Barnsley F.C. players
Port Vale F.C. players
Blackpool F.C. players
Macclesfield Town F.C. players
Wycombe Wanderers F.C. players
Expatriate association footballers in New Zealand
Waitakere United players
Premier League players
English Football League players
Northern Premier League players